Union Bank Building is a skyscraper in Lagos. The 28-story building serves as the headquarters of the Union Bank of Nigeria.

See also
Skyscraper design and construction
List of tallest buildings in Africa

References

External links
Skyscraper profile

Skyscraper office buildings in Lagos